Rick may refer to:

People
Rick (given name), a list of people with the given name
Alan Rick (born 1976), Brazilian politician, journalist, pastor and television personality
Johannes Rick (1869–1946), Austrian-born Brazilian priest and mycologist; also his botanical author abbreviation
Marvin Rick (1901–1999), American middle-distance runner

Units of measure
Rick, a quantity of firewood, related to a cord, in some parts of the US
Rick, a stack or pile of hay, grain or straw

Other uses
Tropical Storm Rick (disambiguation)
Rick (film), a 2003 film starring Bill Pullman
RICK, stock ticker symbol for Rick's Cabaret International, Inc.

See also
Richard (disambiguation)
Ricks (disambiguation)
Ricky (disambiguation)
Rix (disambiguation)